Kamen Rider Revice is a Japanese tokusatsu drama in Toei Company's Kamen Rider series produced by TV Asahi. It is the third series in the Reiwa period run and the 32nd series overall, also commemorating the 50th anniversary of the franchise.

Episodes

References

Revice